Joseph J. Czarnezki (born September 27, 1954) is an American politician and public administrator from Milwaukee, Wisconsin.  He served ten years in the Wisconsin State Senate and two years in the State Assembly, representing western Milwaukee County.  He later led several city departments under Milwaukee mayor John O. Norquist, served eight years as county clerk of Milwaukee County, and was a member of the Milwaukee County board of supervisors.

Life and career 

Born in Milwaukee, Wisconsin, Czarnezki graduated from University of Wisconsin–Milwaukee. In 1980 he was elected to the 7th district of the Wisconsin State Assembly as a Democrat, serving until 1983. From 1983 to 1993, he was a member of the Wisconsin State Senate. Czarnezki was an unsuccessful candidate for Milwaukee County Executive in 1992, losing to F. Thomas Ament. Czarnezki subsequently served in various positions in the administration of Milwaukee Mayor John O. Norquist, including deputy director of administration, health commissioner, director of intergovernmental affairs, executive director of the Milwaukee Fire and Police Commission, and city budget director.

In 2008, Czarnezki was elected County Clerk of Milwaukee County, Wisconsin. In 2012, Czarnezki was reelected county clerk without opposition. Czarnezki did not seek reelection in 2016.

In 2020, Czarnezki was elected to the Milwaukee County Board of Supervisors, representing the 11th supervisory district in the southwestern portion of the county.

Electoral history

Wisconsin Assembly, 7th district (1980)

| colspan="6" style="text-align:center;background-color: #e9e9e9;"| Democratic Primary, September 9, 1980

| colspan="6" style="text-align:center;background-color: #e9e9e9;"| General Election, November 4, 1980

Wisconsin Assembly, 17th district (1982)

| colspan="6" style="text-align:center;background-color: #e9e9e9;"| Democratic Primary, September 14, 1982

| colspan="6" style="text-align:center;background-color: #e9e9e9;"| General Election, November 2, 1982

Wisconsin Senate (1983, 1984, 1988)

| colspan="6" style="text-align:center;background-color: #e9e9e9;"| Special Democratic Primary, September 14, 1982

| colspan="6" style="text-align:center;background-color: #e9e9e9;"| Special Election, April 5, 1983

| colspan="6" style="text-align:center;background-color: #e9e9e9;"| General Election, November 6, 1984

| colspan="6" style="text-align:center;background-color: #e9e9e9;"| General Election, November 8, 1988

References

External links
 Official (county) website (Archived March 5, 2022)

1954 births
Living people
Politicians from Milwaukee
County supervisors in Wisconsin
University of Wisconsin–Milwaukee alumni
Democratic Party members of the Wisconsin State Assembly
Democratic Party Wisconsin state senators